Western Mining Co., Ltd. is a listed company in northwest China engaged in the mining, smelting, and trading of metal minerals, including copper, lead, zinc, iron, gold and silver. It is headquartered in Xining, Qinghai Province. It is currently China's second-largest producer of lead concentrate, fourth-largest producer of zinc concentrate, and seventh-biggest producer of copper concentrate with extraction rights in many metal mines overseas.

History
Its A shares were listed on the Shanghai Stock Exchange on 12 July 2007.

In 2008, the company began trial production at a smelter at its Yulong copper mine in Tibet. 17% stake of the mine was acquired from fellow mining company Zijin Mining in 2007.

Western Mining was a former constituent of SSE 50 Index (the blue chip of Shanghai Stock Exchange). However, it was removed from the index in 2012.

Shareholders

The largest shareholder of the listed company was Western Mining Group for 28.21% shares, which controlled the listed company by majority in the board of directors. Western Mining Group itself is a subsidiary of Qinghai Provincial People's Government for 50.37% stake.

References

External links
  

Metal companies of China
Companies based in Xining
Chinese companies established in 2000
Non-renewable resource companies established in 2000
Companies listed on the Shanghai Stock Exchange
Companies owned by the provincial government of China
Former companies in the SSE 50 Index
2000 establishments in China